Baarmutha is a small town in Victoria, Australia. It is located on Diffey Road in the Shire of Indigo, south of Beechworth.

Baarmutha Post Office opened on 1 October 1875 and closed in 1968.

References

Towns in Victoria (Australia)